Sören Brandy (born 6 May 1985) is a German footballer who last played for Arminia Bielefeld.

References

External links

 
 

1985 births
Living people
German footballers
2. Bundesliga players
3. Liga players
Holstein Kiel players
Rot-Weiss Essen players
SC Paderborn 07 players
MSV Duisburg players
1. FC Union Berlin players
Arminia Bielefeld players
Association football forwards